The GLAAD Vito Russo Award is a special GLAAD Media Award presented annually by the Gay & Lesbian Alliance Against Defamation. It is named in honor of Vito Russo, a founding member of GLAAD, and presented to an openly LGBT media professional who has made a significant difference in promoting equality for the LGBT community.123

List of recipients
 1992 - Jennie Livingston
 1993 - ?
 1994 - ?
 1995 - ?
 1996 - The Celluloid Closet
 1997 - ?
 1998 - k.d. lang
 1999 - RuPaul

2000s
 2000 - Cecilia Dougherty
 2001 - Liz Smith
 2002 - Nathan Lane
 2003 - Rosie O'Donnell
 2004 - Cherry Jones
 2005 - Alan Cumming
 2006 - David LaChapelle
 2007 - Tom Ford
 2008 - Brian Graden
 2009 - Suze Orman

2010s

 2010 - Cynthia Nixon
 2011 - Ricky Martin
 2012 - Craig Zadan and Neil Meron
 2013 - Anderson Cooper
 2014 - George Takei
 2015 - Thomas Roberts
 2017 - Billy Porter
 2018 - Samira Wiley
 2019 - Andy Cohen

2020s
 2022 - Wilson Cruz

References

External links
 Official GLAAD Media Awards website

Vito Russo Award
Lists of LGBT-related award winners and nominees